The results of the Sweet Adelines International competition for choruses in the years 2000–2009 are as follows.

For the equivalent scores in the quartet competition see Sweet Adelines International quartet competitions, 2000–2009 and for a full explanation of the scoring system, qualification process, awards and records, see Sweet Adelines International competition.

Note that the grand total listed in the "final" column is the cumulative total of scores achieved in the semi-final and final rounds of competition. In addition to the direct-qualifying places, wildcard places were awarded to the five highest-scoring second-place quartets across all regional competitions beginning in 2002, indicated herein as "[wild]". The winner of the Harmony Achievement award is indicated with "[harmony achievement]" next to the chorus' name.

2000

2001

 "Blue Lake" was the second place chorus in Region 24's competition in 2000. The winner, "Willamette Sound", was dissolved and absorbed into "Blue Lake", which was renamed and competed at the 2001 international competition as "Pride of Portland".

2002

2003

 Metro Mix qualified in region 20 as Iowa City but competed representing region 5 due to regional boundary changes before the competition.

 Flying High Singers qualified and were to compete in position number 1, and Stockholm in position 29. Both withdrew from the competition before it began. Therefore, Northwest Harmony competed first but are officially listed as contestant number 2. Likewise Smoky Mountain Harmony competed 28th but were officially contestant 30.

2004

 Harmony on the Sound qualified at regional competition as Yankee Maid but changed its name before the international competition.

 Aberdeen qualified and were to compete in position number 7 but withdrew from the competition before it began. Therefore, Sound of Sunshine competed 7th but are officially listed as contestant number 8.

2005

 Sunlight chorus qualified and were to compete in position number 31 but withdrew from the competition before it began. Therefore, Bay Area Showcase competed 31st but are officially listed as contestant number 32.

2006

2007

2008

2009

References

Sources
Sweet Adelines International homepage
 
Barbershophistory.com homepage
historical chorus results
competition records
Sweet Adelines Scores Yahoo! Group [registration required]

Sweet Adelines International competitions